Masoom is a 1983 Hindi film, the directorial debut of Shekhar Kapur. It is an adaptation of the 1980 novel Man, Woman and Child by Erich Segal which was also adapted into a Malayalam movie Olangal and an American movie Man, Woman and Child. The film stars Naseeruddin Shah and Shabana Azmi in lead roles along with Tanuja, Supriya Pathak and Saeed Jaffrey. It features Jugal Hansraj, Aradhana and Urmila Matondkar as child actors. The screenplay, dialogues and lyrics are by Gulzar with music by R.D. Burman. The film has been remade into a Telugu movie named Illalu Priyuralu and in Turkish as Bir Akşam Üstü.

Plot
Indu and DK have a happy marriage and two daughters — Pinky and Minni — and live in Delhi. The tranquility of their life is interrupted when DK receives word that he has a son, Rahul, the result of an affair with Bhavana during his 1973 visit to Nainital when his wife Indu was about to give birth to their first child Pinky. Bhavana did not tell DK about their son as she did not want to disturb DK's matrimonial life. Now that she has died, her guardian Masterji sends word to DK informing him that his son, Rahul, who is nine years old, needs a home. Despite the objections of Indu, who is devastated to learn of her husband's infidelity, DK brings the boy to stay with them in Delhi. Rahul is never told that DK is his father as he bonds with DK and his daughters. But Indu can't bear to look at him, a tangible reminder of DK's betrayal.

DK, worried by the effect Rahul is having on his family, decides to put him in a boarding school in St. Joseph's College, Nainital; Rahul accepts with reluctance. After gaining admission at the school and returning to Delhi before his permanent move to Nainital, Rahul figures out that DK is his father and runs away from home. After he is escorted home by a police officer, Rahul confesses his awareness of the identity of his father to Indu. Indu is unable to bear his heartbreak and intercepts Rahul before he is put on the train to Nainital, thereby accepting him into the family and wholeheartedly forgiving DK, after which they drive home happily.

Cast
 Naseeruddin Shah as Devendra Kumar Malhotra (DK) 
 Shabana Azmi as Indu Malhotra 
 Supriya Pathak as Bhavana 
 Jugal Hansraj as Rahul Malhotra, DK's son by Bhavana
 Urmila Matondkar as Pinky Malhotra, DK and Indu's elder daughter
 Aradhana Srivastav as Minni Malhotra, DK and Indu's younger daughter and Pinky's younger sister 
 Tanuja as Chanda, Indu's friend, a socialite
 Saeed Jaffrey as Suri, DK's family friend 
 Paidi Jairaj as Master Ji, Bhavana's guardian
 Satish Kaushik as Tiwari
 Malvika Singh as Mrs. Suri

Soundtrack
The music of the movie was composed by R. D. Burman and the lyrics were penned by the noted lyricist Gulzar who also wrote the screenplay for the film. Burman won the Filmfare Award for Best Music for this film.

Awards

References

External links 
 

Films scored by R. D. Burman
1982 films
1980s Hindi-language films
Hindi remakes of Malayalam films
Films directed by Shekhar Kapur
Films set in Delhi
Films set in Uttarakhand
Indian children's films
Films based on American novels
Films shot in Uttarakhand
Hindi films remade in other languages
1982 directorial debut films